Rotonda is a town and comune in the province of Potenza, in the Southern Italian region of Basilicata.

Rotonda is home to the Melanzana rossa di Rotonda production. This is the only Ethiopian Eggplant grown in Europe in significant quantities. It is a reddish kind of aubergine that looks similar to a tomato.

References

Cities and towns in Basilicata